Calvin Bernard Tiggle (born November 10, 1968), is a former award-winning linebacker in the Canadian Football League.

After graduating from the Georgia Institute of Technology (playing with the Georgia Tech Yellow Jackets) he played two seasons (1991 and 1992) with the Tampa Bay Buccaneers of the NFL, where in 24 games he recorded one quarterback sack.

He came to Canada in 1994, playing his first of 4 seasons with the Toronto Argonauts. He was an all star in his first season, setting the team record with 129 tackles. He moved to the Hamilton Tiger-Cats for 4 seasons in 1996, and was an all star in 1998 and 1999, also winning the CFL's Most Outstanding Defensive Player Award in 1999. He finished his career with Toronto in 2000 and 2001, where he was again an all star in 2000. He had the most single game tackles by a Hamilton Tiger-Cat (15).

In 2004, he was issued a departure order to leave Canada after an Immigration Minister's permit to play football expired. 

1968 births
Living people
American players of Canadian football
American football linebackers
Canadian football linebackers
Canadian Football League Most Outstanding Defensive Player Award winners
Georgia Tech Yellow Jackets football players
Hamilton Tiger-Cats players
People from Fort Washington, Maryland
Players of American football from Maryland
Tampa Bay Buccaneers players
Toronto Argonauts players